Sir Christopher Hubert Llewellyn Smith  (born 19 November 1942) is an Emeritus Professor of Physics at the University of Oxford.

Education
Llewellyn Smith was educated at the University of Oxford (BA) and completed his Doctor of Philosophy degree in theoretical physics at New College, Oxford in 1967.

Career and research
After his DPhil he worked at the Lebedev Physical Institute in Moscow, CERN and then the SLAC National Accelerator Laboratory before returning to Oxford in 1974. Llewellyn Smith was elected a Fellow of the Royal Society in 1984.

While Chairman of Oxford Physics (1987–92), he led the merger of five different departments into a single Physics Department. Smith was Director General of CERN from 1994 to 1998. Thereafter he served as Provost and President of University College London (1999–2002).

Awards and honours
Llewellyn Smith received the James Clerk Maxwell Medal and Prize in 1979, and Glazebrook Medal and Prize of the Institute of Physics in 1999 and was knighted in 2001. In 2004, he became Chairman of the Consultative Committee for Euratom on Fusion (CCE-FU). Until 2009 he was Director of UKAEA Culham Division, which holds the responsibility for the United Kingdom's fusion programme and operation of the Joint European Torus (JET). He is a member of the Advisory Council for the Campaign for Science and Engineering.
In 2013, he joined the National Institute of Science Education and Research (NISER), Bhubaneswar, India as a Distinguished Professor.
In 2015, he was awarded the Royal Medal of the Royal Society.

Personal life
Llewellyn Smith married in 1966 and has one son and one daughter.

References

1942 births
Living people
Alumni of New College, Oxford
British nuclear physicists
English physicists
People associated with CERN
Experimental particle physics
Experimental physicists
Academics of University College London
Fellows of New College, Oxford
Fellows of St John's College, Oxford
Fellows of the Royal Society
Foreign Fellows of the Indian National Science Academy
International Centre for Synchrotron-Light for Experimental Science Applications in the Middle East people
Knights Bachelor
Maxwell Medal and Prize recipients
Particle physicists
Provosts of University College London
Department of Physics, University of Oxford